Otto Hauser (April 12/27, 1874 in Wädenswil – June 14/19, 1932 in Berlin) was a Swiss prehistorian.

Literary works 
 Der Mensch vor 100,000 Jahren, 1917.
 Ins Paradies des Urmenschen, 1922.

References 
 "Otto Hauser."  In Biographical Dictionary of the History of Paleoanthropology. Edited by Matthew R. Goodrum. (2016) available at https://drive.google.com/file/d/13Dj9JqKO-9LwCs8JE88wpL5p4XuLhGi_/view
 Rudolf Drößler: Flucht aus dem Paradies: Leben, Ausgrabungen und Entdeckungen Otto Hausers. Halle, 1988
 Delluc B. et G. : "Otto Hauser était-il un espion allemand? Biographie", in: Petites énigmes et grands mystères, IV, Pilote 24 édition, 2010, p. 80 à 157, ill.

20th-century Swiss historians
Swiss male writers
Prehistorians
1874 births
1932 deaths
People from Wädenswil